Butler Township is the name of three townships in the U.S. state of Indiana:

 Butler Township, DeKalb County, Indiana
 Butler Township, Franklin County, Indiana
 Butler Township, Miami County, Indiana

See also
 Butler Township (disambiguation)

Indiana township disambiguation pages